NASCAR Kinetics: Marketing in Motion was established in 2009 with the mission of connecting college students nationwide to NASCAR.  The program gave participants insight on possible career paths, and was meant to help develop their ability to collaborate with other students.  Weekly assignments and projects were based on real-world challenges and opportunities facing NASCAR and its sponsors.

The winner of the fall 2011 semester of NASCAR Kinetics: Marketing in Motion was the University of Central Florida.

NASCAR Kinetics: Marketing in Motion mentored its last round on college students in 2013. During its four-year history, many graduates of the program earned sports, sports marketing and business internships and full-time jobs, some with NASCAR itself.

2012 spring semester participating universities
Belmont Abbey College
Centenary College
Central Michigan University
Coastal Carolina University
East Tennessee State University
High Point University
Indiana State University
Ohio State University
Ohio University
Oklahoma State University
Southern New Hampshire University
Troy University
University of Central Florida
University of Florida
University of Miami
University of Oregon
Virginia State University

References

NASCAR Reaches Howard University
NASCAR Kinetics Speeds through with Panel
UTPA Chosen for NASCAR Kinetics
Broncs Claim NASCAR Kinetics Victory
UTPA Steers Toward Success
WSSU to Host NASCAR Viewing Party
NASCAR Rev's Up Central Michigan University

NASCAR